The Mount Holly Township Public Schools are a comprehensive community public school district, that serves students in pre-kindergarten through eighth grade from Mount Holly, in Burlington County, New Jersey, United States.

As of the 2021–22 school year, the district, comprised of three schools, had an enrollment of 1,079 students and 102.0 classroom teachers (on an FTE basis), for a student–teacher ratio of 10.6:1.

The district is classified by the New Jersey Department of Education as being in District Factor Group "B", the second lowest of eight groupings. District Factor Groups organize districts statewide to allow comparison by common socioeconomic characteristics of the local districts. From lowest socioeconomic status to highest, the categories are A, B, CD, DE, FG, GH, I and J.

As of the 2021–22 school year, the high school had an enrollment of 2,048 students and 140.3 classroom teachers (on an FTE basis), for a student–teacher ratio of 14.6:1. The school is located in Mount Holly.

Schools
Schools in the district (with 2021–22 enrollment data from the National Center for Education Statistics) are:
Elementary schools
John Brainerd School with 293 students in grades PreK-1
Nicole Peoples, Principal
Gertrude C. Folwell School with 302 students in grades 2-4
Tom Braddock, Principal
Middle school
F. W. Holbein Middle School with 439 students in grades 6-8
Daniel Finn, Principal

In 1948, during de jure educational segregation in the United States, the district had a school for black children. It lacked the cafeteria and disabled/handicapped features that the school for white children had.

Administration
Core members of the district's administration are: 
Robert Mungo, Superintendent
Evon DiGangi, Business Administrator / Board Secretary

Board of education
The district's board of education is comprised of five members who set policy and oversee the fiscal and educational operation of the district through its administration. As a Type II school district, the board's trustees are elected directly by voters to serve three-year terms of office on a staggered basis, with either one or two seats up for election each year held (since 2012) as part of the November general election. The board appoints a superintendent to oversee the district's day-to-day operations and a business administrator to supervise the business functions of the district.

On January 25, 2012, the Board voted, 3-1, to move school elections from April to November following the adoption of legislation allowing New Jersey school districts, municipal governing bodies, or citizen petition committees to do so.

References

External links
Mount Holly Township Public Schools

School Data for the Mount Holly Township School District, National Center for Education Statistics

Mount Holly, New Jersey
New Jersey District Factor Group B
School districts in Burlington County, New Jersey